The Bärenkopf is a mountain, in the Rauer Knöll-Verzweigung in the southeastern Karwendel south of Pertisau at the Achen Lake in Tyrol.

Mountain hikers reach the summit in a three-hour mountain hike from Pertisau. A few metres west of the summit plateau, a rock step and a further section of the trail with ropes are present.

References

External links 
 Tourenbeschreibung
 Tiroler Schutzgebiete: Landschaftsschutzgebiet Bärenkopf

Mountains of the Alps
Mountains of Tyrol (state)
Karwendel
One-thousanders of Austria